Union Station is a railway station located at Washington Square in downtown Worcester, Massachusetts.  It is the western terminus of the Massachusetts Bay Transportation Authority's Framingham/Worcester commuter rail line, with inbound service to Boston, and a station along Amtrak's Lake Shore Limited passenger line.  It also services Peter Pan and Greyhound intercity bus routes and acts as a hub for the local Worcester Regional Transit Authority (WRTA) bus service.

History 

The current station was built in 1911 by the New York Central Railroad along the Boston and Albany Railroad Main Line, during the heyday of railroading in the United States, replacing the previous 1875 station. As a union station, it also served the Providence and Worcester Railroad (which was acquired by the New York, New Haven and Hartford Railroad or 'New Haven'), the Norwich and Worcester Railroad (acquired by the New York and New England Railroad), the Worcester, Nashua and Rochester Railroad and the Boston, Barre and Gardner Railroad (which both became part of the Boston and Maine Railroad). 

Up to the late 1960s the New York Central ran the New England section of the Wolverine route to Chicago through southwestern Ontario and Detroit and the New England States. The daytime New York City – Maine East Wind (B&M with the New Haven Railroad) ended in 1955. The overnight New York City – Maine State of Maine (B&M/NH) used the routing until October 29, 1960.

The last pre-Amtrak service, on April 30, 1971, was an unnamed Penn Central successor to the New England States. Passenger service to Union Station lapsed between 1971 and 1975, and the abandoned station fell into disrepair.

 Subsequently, Union Station was acquired by the Worcester Redevelopment Authority and completely renovated at a cost of $32 million. The station was restored and renovated by Finegold Alexader Architects of Boston, and re-opened in July 2000. An intercity and local bus terminal, with five bus ports, was added at a cost of $5.2 million and opened in August 2006.

Union Station's facilities include the Grand Hall, with original elliptical stained-glass ceilings, interior marble columns and mahogany wood trim, Luciano's Cotton Club, a 1920s gangster-themed restaurant, and the Union Station Parking Garage, which has 500 spaces and direct access to the station. The Cannabis Control Commission established their state headquarters in Union Station in 2019.

Worcester Union Station is a proposed intermediate station for East-West Rail, which would provide intercity passenger service between Boston and Pittsfield.

Second platform

Union Station is accessible and has a single high-level side platform several cars long. It is the only station on the line (other than the three limited-service Newton stations) that can only be served by one train at a time – all other stations have two side platforms or an island platform. This limits the number of daily trains that can serve Worcester, and causes frequent cascading delays. After years of discussion about adding a second platform and extending the side platform to full length, the MBTA approved a two-year, $4 million design contract in October 2018. 

Design reached 30% in August 2019. The -long island platform will have an accessible footbridge at its east end, and stairs and an elevator into a converted storage room to provide direct access from the station building. A crossover east of the station will also be built. The full length of the new platform will have a canopy. Construction is estimated to cost between $40 and $48 million. A temporary platform east of the I-290 overpass will be used while the west half of the new platform is constructed; the west half will then be used while the east half is built.  

In October 2020, $29.3 million in federal funding for the project was announced. A $44.4 million construction contract was approved on October 27, 2021. Notice to proceed was given on November 29, 2021, with completion expected in December 2023. The temporary platform was constructed over the weekend of March 12–13, 2022, and entered service on March 14. By December 2022, construction was 40% complete, with completion expected in February 2024.

Bus connections
Greyhound Bus Lines and Peter Pan Bus Lines operate intercity bus service from Worcester along major highways. OurBus service to New York City stops next to Union Station, on Franklin Street.

In April 2012, the Worcester Regional Transit Authority broke ground on a new regional transit hub adjacent to historic Union Station. The cost was $14 million, with $10 million coming from the Federal Government and the rest coming from the state. The new hub opened in May 2013.

The hub is served by routes 1, 2, 3, 4, 5, 6, 7, 11, 14, 15, 16, 19, 23, 24, 25, 26, 27, 29, 30, 31, 33, and 42.

References

External links

Worcester – MBTA

Worcester Union Station Improvements – MBTA
Google Maps Street View: Front Street, Harding Street, I-290

Amtrak stations in Massachusetts
Bus stations in Massachusetts
Worcester
Worcester, Massachusetts
Worcester, Massachusetts
Worcester, Massachusetts
Worcester, Massachusetts
Railway stations in the United States opened in 1911
Transit centers in the United States
Transportation in Worcester, Massachusetts
Towers in Massachusetts
Railway stations on the National Register of Historic Places in Massachusetts
MBTA Commuter Rail stations in Worcester County, Massachusetts
National Register of Historic Places in Worcester, Massachusetts
Historic district contributing properties in Massachusetts
1911 establishments in Massachusetts
Skyscrapers in Worcester, Massachusetts
Transportation buildings and structures in Worcester County, Massachusetts